The Milk Can Game can refer to:

Milk Can (college football), an annual football game between Boise State University and Fresno State University
Milk Can Game (high school football), an annual high school football game between North Hunterdon High School and Voorhees High School